John H. Riddle  (1864–1931) was a Minor League Baseball player. He played in 11 games for the   Washington Nationals of the National League and 27 games for the 1890 Philadelphia Athletics of the American Association.

External links

Major League Baseball outfielders
Major League Baseball catchers
Washington Nationals (1886–1889) players
Philadelphia Athletics (AA) players
Baseball players from Pennsylvania
1864 births
1931 deaths
19th-century baseball players
Washington Senators (minor league) players
Newark Little Giants players
Chattanooga Chatts players
Lebanon Pretzel Eaters players